Marie-Claire Schanne-Klein is a French physicist who is a professor at the French National Centre for Scientific Research. She is based in the Laboratory for Optics and Biosciences, where she studies the nonlinear optics of chiral molecules.

Early life and education 
Schanne-Klein studied physics at the École polytechnique. She moved to the Paris-Sud University for graduate studies focused on lasers, before returning to École polytechnique for doctoral research, where she worked on non-linear optics.

Research and career 
Schanne-Klein combines theoretical and experimental approaches to better understand molecular materials. Specifically, she studies nonlinear optics of chiral molecules and second-harmonic generation imaging of collagen fibres. Using Hyper–Rayleigh scattering, Schanne-Klein showed that the hyperpolarizability of collagen fibres, which forms the basis of the contrast observed in non-linear optical measurements, occurred due to the coherent amplification of peptide bonds along the lengths of the molecules.

Schanne-Klein has applied her understanding of spectroscopy to understand aged parchments. These parchments often contain collagen, and Schanne-Klein showed that non-linear optical microscopy could be used to evaluate degradation within the material.

Schanne-Klein is a professor at the French National Centre for Scientific Research and the École polytechnique.

In 2019 Schanne Klein was awarded the CNRS Silver Medal.

Selected publications

References 

Living people
21st-century French physicists
20th-century French physicists
French women physicists
French National Centre for Scientific Research scientists
École Polytechnique alumni
Paris-Sud University alumni
Year of birth missing (living people)